The Bezirk Schwaz is an administrative district (Bezirk) in Tyrol, Austria. It borders Bavaria (Germany) in the north, the districts of Kufstein, Kitzbühel and Pinzgau (Salzburg) in the east, South Tyrol (Italy) in the south, and the Innsbruck-Land district in the west.

Area of the district is 1,887.49 km², with a population of 79,511 (January 1, 2012), and population density of 42 persons per km². Administrative center of the district is Schwaz.

Geography 
The district comprises a part of the lower Inn valley, the complete Zillertal valley with its tributary valleys (like the Tuxertal), and the Achental valley with the Achensee. Mountain ranges within the district include the Tux Alps, Zillertal Alps, Kitzbühel Alps, the Karwendel and the Rofan.

Administrative divisions 
The district is divided into 39 municipalities:

 Achenkirch (2,156)
 Aschau im Zillertal (1,732)
 Brandberg (348)
 Bruck am Ziller (993)
 Buch bei Jenbach (2,549)
 Eben am Achensee (2,849)
 Finkenberg (1,510)
 Fügen (3,838)
 Fügenberg (1,341)
 Gallzein (598)
 Gerlos (786)
 Gerlosberg (483)
 Hainzenberg (687)
 Hart im Zillertal (1,510)
 Hippach (1,376)
 Jenbach (6,851)
 Kaltenbach (1,229)
 Mayrhofen (3,821)
 Pill (1,112)
 Ramsau im Zillertal (1,570)
 Ried im Zillertal (1,225)
 Rohrberg (533)
 Schlitters (1,400)
 Schwaz (13,058)
 Schwendau (1,608)
 Stans (1,930)
 Steinberg am Rofan (295)
 Strass im Zillertal (840)
 Stumm (1,807)
 Stummerberg (841)
 Terfens (2,082)
 Tux (1,932)
 Uderns (1,663)
 Vomp (4,661)
 Weer (1,545)
 Weerberg (2,337)
 Wiesing (2,039)
 Zell am Ziller (1,743)
 Zellberg (633)

 
Districts of Tyrol (state)